The Auxiliary Services Act was a German law introduced during the First World War on 6 December 1916 to facilitate the Hindenburg Programme.

The Law on the Patriotic Auxiliary Service marks a significant stage towards Total War and, in the long run, in the development of German labor law. The law was a step towards the total militarization of the economy and the mobilization of all material and personnel resources in a quest to make Germany fit for industrial warfare. However, to maintain the support of the Reichstag and the loyalty of workers, the German government made numerous concessions to help avoid labor conflicts. Thus the law provided for a system of shop-level conciliation committees. In this way the state legally recognised the trade unions as equal negotiating partners with the employers. It also established the social partnerships between the economic associations of workers and employers. Thus both employee participation and trade union influence were expanded under the authority of the Reichstag.

The Prussian general Wilhelm Groener, head of the newly formed Kriegsamt (equivalent to an Office for Economic Warfare), was responsible for implementing the law.

References

German labour law